Matěj Hádek (born 29 November 1975 in Prague) is a Czech actor. He starred in the film Operace Silver A under director Jiří Strach in 2007. His brother Kryštof Hádek is also an actor.

References

External links
 

Czech male film actors
Czech male stage actors
Czech male television actors
1975 births
Living people
Male actors from Prague
21st-century Czech male actors
20th-century Czech male actors
Prague Conservatory alumni
Czech Lion Awards winners